Malinowo may refer to the following places:
Malinowo, Bielsk County in Podlaskie Voivodeship (north-east Poland)
Malinowo, Siemiatycze County in Podlaskie Voivodeship (north-east Poland)
Malinowo, Wysokie Mazowieckie County in Podlaskie Voivodeship (north-east Poland)
Malinowo, Pomeranian Voivodeship (north Poland)
Malinowo, Bartoszyce County in Warmian-Masurian Voivodeship (north Poland)
Malinowo, Działdowo County in Warmian-Masurian Voivodeship (north Poland)
Malinowo, Olsztyn County in Warmian-Masurian Voivodeship (north Poland)